Mike Miles may refer to:
 Mike Miles (school superintendent), school superintendent in Dallas, Texas
 Mike Miles (basketball), American college basketball player

See also
 Michael Miles, New Zealand-born television presenter in Great Britain
 Michael A. Miles, American marketer and businessman